The Azerbaijan Women's Handball Championship is the premier league for women's handball clubs in Azerbaijan. First held in 1993 following the collapse of the Soviet Union, it has been dominated since by ABU Baku, 10 titles.

List of champions

 1993 Halita Baku
 1994 Halita Baku
 1995 Halita Baku
 1996 
 1997 
 1998 
 1999 
 2000 
 2001 ABU Baku
 2002 ABU Baku
 2003 ABU Baku
 2004 ABU Baku
 2005 ABU Baku
 2006 ABU Baku
 2007 ABU Baku
 2008 ABU Baku
 2009 ABU Baku
 2010 ABU Baku
 2011 ABU Baku
 2012 ABU Baku
 2013 ABU Baku
 2014 ABU Baku
 2015 ABU Baku
 2016 ABU Baku

References

Women's handball leagues
Women's handball in Azerbaijan
Women's sports leagues in Azerbaijan